The Muley El-Mehdi Mosque is a mosque in Ceuta.

History
The construction of the mosque started in 1939 and completed in 1940. It was then inaugurated on 18 July 1940. In 2017, the building underwent renovation.

Architecture
The mosque is the largest one in Ceuta.

See also
 Islam in Spain

References

1940 establishments in Spain
Islam in Spain
Mosques completed in 1940
Mosques in Africa
Buildings and structures in Ceuta